Louisa C. Lim is a journalist and author. She is the co-host of The Little Red Podcast, a podcast covering China.

Lim graduated from the University of Melbourne with a PhD for her thesis "In Search of the King of Kowloon; Hong Kong’s Identity Crisis and the Media Creation of an Icon". She is currently a Senior Lecturer at the University of Melbourne where she teaches audio journalism and podcasting.

Lim is of Eurasian ancestry. She has heritage from an ethnic Chinese Singaporean father and a British mother. She worked as a journalist, living in China for around 10 years, and having experience working for BBC and National Public Radio (NPR). She has stated that her level of speaking Cantonese was "shamefully basic" but she identifies as a Hong Konger regardless.

The People’s Republic of Amnesia was shortlisted for the Orwell Prize and the Helen Bernstein Book Award for Excellence in Journalism, while Indelible City was shortlisted for the 2023 Victorian Premier's Literary Award for Nonfiction.

Books
Indelible City: Dispossession and Defiance in Hong Kong (Riverhead Books, 2022)
The People's Republic of Amnesia: Tiananmen Revisited (Oxford University Press, 2014)

References

External links
Official website
 Louisa Lim at NPR

Living people
Year of birth missing (living people)
University of Melbourne alumni
Academic staff of the University of Melbourne
Australian journalists
Australian women journalists
21st-century non-fiction writers
Australian podcasters
Australian women podcasters